Alphonso George Kellam (November 23, 1837June 15, 1909) was an American lawyer, judge, and Republican politician.  He was one of the original justices of the South Dakota Supreme Court, and previously served one term the Wisconsin State Assembly.  He also served as a Union Army officer in the American Civil War.

Biography

After being educated at Genesee Wesleyan Seminary in Lima, New York, Kellam arrived in Wisconsin about 1857 and studied law with a firm in Elkhorn, Wisconsin. Admitted to the bar in 1859, he practiced in Delavan until his service in the American Civil War.

In 1862, he assisted in raising a company of volunteers for the Union Army and was elected their captain.  His company was enrolled as Company D of the 22nd Wisconsin Infantry Regiment.  He was captured during the Battle of Thompson's Station in March 1863 and spent time as a prisoner of war in Libby Prison.  Subsequent to his imprisonment, he was detailed to the staff of brigade commander John Coburn, where he served during the Atlanta Campaign and Sherman's March to the Sea, through the close of the war.  He was designated for promotion to major in 1864, but the rank was never made official.

He mustered out in June 1865 and resumed his legal practice in Delavan. He served a one year term in the Wisconsin State Assembly in 1869. In 1871 he moved to Hampton, Iowa, where he practiced law and became president of a local bank. In 1881 he moved to Chamberlain in the Dakota Territory, where he founded a bank and practiced law. After serving in the constitutional conventions of 1883, 1885, and 1889, he was elected to the South Dakota Supreme Court in 1889 and again in 1893.

Kellam resigned in January 1896 amid allegations of adultery and bribery.  He immediately fled the state to Spokane, Washington, and re-established himself as a lawyer, practicing there until his death in 1909.

Kellam was married in October 1865 to Clara Cole in Smithfield, New York. They had two children, though one died in infancy. Their son, Fred W. Kellam, also became a lawyer in Spokane.

References

|-

People from Hampton, Iowa
People from Monroe County, New York
People from Chamberlain, South Dakota
Politicians from Spokane, Washington
People from Walworth County, Wisconsin
People of Wisconsin in the American Civil War
South Dakota lawyers
Washington (state) lawyers
Wisconsin lawyers
Members of the Wisconsin State Assembly
Justices of the South Dakota Supreme Court
1837 births
1909 deaths
People from Lima, New York
Lawyers from Spokane, Washington
19th-century American politicians
19th-century American judges